"Sweet Caroline" is a 1969 song by Neil Diamond. Sweet Caroline may also refer to:

 "Sweet Caroline" (Prison Break), 2007
 "Sweet Caroline", a song from a re-release of the 1969 album Ahead Rings Out by Blodwyn Pig
 "Sweet Caroline", a song from The Gap Band's 1980 eponymous album The Gap Band III

See also
 Caroline (disambiguation)